Qaleh-ye Nasir (also Romanized as Qal‘eh-ye Naşīr; also known as Helāl and Qal‘eh-ye Nāşer) is a village in Ben Moala Rural District, in the Central District of Shush County, Khuzestan Province, Iran. At the 2006 census, its population was 271, in 41 families.

References 

Populated places in Shush County